CITIC Group Corporation Ltd.,  formerly the China International Trust Investment Corporation (CITIC), is a state-owned investment company of the People's Republic of China, established by Rong Yiren in 1979 with the approval of Deng Xiaoping.  Its headquarters are in Chaoyang District, Beijing. As of 2019, it is China's biggest state-run conglomerate with one of the largest pools of foreign assets in the world.

Businesses

Its initial aim was to "attract and utilize foreign capital, introduce advanced technologies, and adopt advanced and scientific international practice in operation and management." It now owns 44 subsidiaries including China CITIC Bank, CITIC Limited, CITIC Trust and CITIC Merchant (mainly banks) in China, Hong Kong, the United States, Canada, Australia and New Zealand.

History
CITIC Group was founded as the China International Trust Investment Corporation (abb. CITIC), a Chinese state-owned enterprise in 1979. In the 1980s, Chinese government founded many for profit corporations, which CITIC was under the leadership of Rong Yiren, a former businessman and politician at that time, who chose to stay in the Mainland China in the 1950s after his family business was nationalized. His son, Larry Yung, was the former chairman of CITIC Group's listed subsidiary CITIC Pacific. Larry also led the Hong Kong office and parent company of CITIC Pacific since 1986; Larry became a Hong Kong-based businessman since 1978.

CITIC Group headquarters was based in Beijing; Hong Kong office was formally opened in 1985. The Mainland-based CITIC Bank was founded by the group in 1984. The group also acquired 12.5% stake of the Hong Kong flag carrier Cathay Pacific in 1987, and became a member of a shareholders' agreement in 2006; the stake was sold to fellow state-owned company Air China in 2009. The group also acquired Hong Kong-based Ka Wah Bank in 1986. In 1990, the group also absorbed some of the subsidiaries of another state-owned company, . Other notable acquisitions included 38.3% stake of another airline Dragonair, 20% stake of Hong Kong Telecom, etc.

CITIC also acquired a Hong Kong listed company and renamed to CITIC Pacific in the 1990s. Part of the assets of the group were injected into the listed company as reverse IPO, including the stake of aforementioned Cathay Pacific. A full reverse IPO took place in 2014.

2000s

Its subsidiary, CITIC Pacific (now known as CITIC Limited), made unauthorized bets on the foreign currency market in October 2008 and lost HK$14.7 billion (US$1.9 billion, when accounted for in mark-to-market terms). Senior executives such as Financial Controller Chau Chi-Yin and Group Finance Director Leslie Chang resigned. Its stock price plunged 55.1 percent upon the resumption of trade.

CITIC Group injected most of their assets to CITIC Limited in 2014. However, CITIC Guoan Group was excluded, which was recapitalized by other private capital.

In 2015, CITIC Group sold 10% stake of CITIC Limited to a joint-venture of Itochu and Charoen Pokphand for HK$34.4 billion (US$4.54 billion); the joint venture also subscribed new convertible preferred shares for HK$45.9 billion (or US$5.9 billion). It was reported it was the largest investment ever made by a Japanese general trading company. The transaction is also the largest acquisition in China by a Japanese company, and the largest investment by foreigners in a Chinese state-owned enterprise.

In 2016, CITIC Group ranked 156th among the Fortune Global 500, with an annual revenue of $55,938 million.

CITIC CEFC bond default 

In November 2016, CITIC CLSA acted as the sole bookrunner for CEFC Shanghai's US$250 bond issuance. CITIC CLSA hid from the market that the bond deal was only 60% subscribed at pricing.  It manipulated the bond price in the secondary market in an effort to offload the 100mm USD bond CITIC CLSA held on its balance sheet.

In May 2018, CITIC Group announced they would repay ca 450 million euros owed by CEFC Europe to finance and banking group J&T within days but since the debt was not paid a week later, J&T announced it had taken over shareholder rights and installed crisis management at CEFC Europe. Several days later, CEFC Shanghai defaulted on $327 million in bond payments, and offered to make the payments six months after the maturity date.

In October 2020, some retail CEFC bondholders in Hong Kong filed a complaint to the Securities and Futures Commission in Hong Kong against the bond's sole underwriter CITIC CLSA.

Group companies
 CITIC Limited, a subsidiary of CITIC group in Hong Kong
 CITIC Trust
 China CITIC Bank
 CITIC International Financial Holdings
 CITIC Bank International
 CITIC Resources
 CITIC Construction
 CITIC Newedge
 CITIC Real Estate
 CITIC Capital
 Amoy Food
 CITIC Metal Group
 CITIC press

Equity investments
 CITIC Guoan Group (20.95%)
 CITIC Securities

See also

 CITIC Plaza, a skyscraper in Guangzhou
 CITIC Tower, a skyscraper in Hong Kong
CITIC Heavy Industries in Luoyang

Footnotes

References

External links

 Official web

 
Government-owned companies of China
Companies based in Beijing
Conglomerate companies established in 1979
Chinese companies established in 1979
Chinese brands
Conglomerate companies of China
Multinational companies headquartered in China
Chaoyang District, Beijing
Ministry of Finance of the People's Republic of China
1979 establishments in China